The transfer of sovereignty of Macau from Portugal to the People's Republic of China (PRC) occurred on 20 December 1999.

Macau was settled by Portuguese merchants in 1557, during the Ming dynasty and was subsequently under various degrees of Portuguese rule until 1999. Portugal's involvement in the region was formally recognised by the Qing dynasty in 1749. The Portuguese governor João Maria Ferreira do Amaral, emboldened by the First Opium War and the Treaty of Nanking, attempted to annex the territory, expelling Qing authorities in 1846, but was assassinated. After the Second Opium War, the Portuguese government, along with a British representative, signed the 1887 Sino-Portuguese Treaty of Peking that gave Portugal perpetual colonial rights to Macau on the condition that Portugal would cooperate in efforts to end the smuggling of opium.

After the founding of the People's Republic of China in 1949, and the transfer of China's seat to the PRC at the United Nations in 1971, then Foreign Minister Huang Hua appealed to the UN Special Committee on Decolonization to remove Macau (and Hong Kong) from its list of colonies, preferring bilateral negotiations ending in a return of the territory, rather than the independence of the territory as was implied by its inclusion on the list.

On 25 April 1974, a group of left-wing Portuguese officers organized a coup d'état in Lisbon, overthrowing the right-wing dictatorship that had controlled Portugal for 48 years. The new government began to transition Portugal to a democratic system and was committed to decolonization. The government carried out decolonization policies, and proposed Macau's handover to China in 1978. The Chinese government rejected this proposal, believing that an early transfer of Macau would impact relations with Hong Kong.

On 31 December 1975, the Portuguese government withdrew its remaining troops from Macau. On 8 February 1979, the Portuguese government decided to break off diplomatic relations with the Republic of China, and established diplomatic relations with the People's Republic of China the next day. Both Portugal and the People's Republic of China recognized Macau as Chinese territory. The colony remained under Portuguese rule until 20 December 1999, when it was transferred to China and became the Macau Special Administrative Region of the People's Republic of China. This marked the end of nearly 600 years of the European colonial era.

Negotiations 
On 20 May 1986, the People's Republic of China, along with Portugal, officially announced that talks on Macanese affairs would take place in Beijing on 30 June 1986. The Portuguese delegation arrived in Beijing in June, and was welcomed by the Chinese delegation led by Zhou Nan.

The talks consisted of four sessions, all held in Beijing:
 The first conference: 30 June – 1 July 1986
 The second conference: 9–10 September 1986
 The third conference: 21–22 October 1986
 The fourth conference: 18–23 March 1987

During the negotiations, Portuguese representatives offered to return Macau in 1985, but Chinese representatives rejected that year (as well rejecting previous requests for 1967, 1975, and 1977). China requested 1997, the same year as Hong Kong, but Portugal refused. 2004 was suggested by Portugal, as well as 2007 as that year would mark the 450th anniversary of Portugal renting Macau. However, China insisted for a year before 2000 as the Sino-British Joint Liaison Group in Hong Kong would be dissolved in 2000 as envisioned in 1986 (the Joint Liaison Group would be dissolved in 1999). Eventually the year 1999 was agreed upon.

On 13 April 1987, the Joint Declaration on the Question of Macau by the governments of the People's Republic of China and the Portuguese Republic was formally signed by the Prime Ministers of both governments in Beijing.

Transition period (1987–1999) 
The twelve years between the signing of the "Sino-Portuguese Declaration" on 13 April 1987 and the transfer of sovereignty on 20 December 1999 were known as "the transition".

On 15 January 1988, the Chinese Foreign Affairs Department announced the Chinese members of the groups that would begin the talk on the issues of Macau during the transition. On 13 April, the "Draft of the Basic Law of the Macau Special Administrative Region Committee" was established during the seventh National People's Congress, and on 25 October, the committee convened the first conference, in which they passed the general outline of the draft and the steps, and decided to organise the "Draft of the Basic Law of Macau Special Administrative Region Information Committee". On 31 March 1993, the National People's Congress passed the resolution on the Basic Law of Macau, which marked the beginning of the latter part of the transition.

Transfer 

In the afternoon of 19 December 1999, the 127th Portuguese Governor of Macau Vasco Joaquim Rocha Vieira lowered the flags in Macau, which was the prelude of the ceremony for the establishment of the Macau Special Administrative Region. The official transfer of sovereignty was held at midnight on that day at the Cultural Centre of Macau Garden. The ceremony began in the evening and ended at dawn of 20 December.

The evening of 19 December began with dragon and lion dances. These were followed by a slideshow of historical events and features of Macau, which included a mixture of the religions and races of the East and the West, and the unique society of native Portuguese born in Macau. In the final performance, 442 children who represented the 442 years of Portuguese history in Macau were presented along with several international stars to perform the song "Praise for Peace".

Aftermath 
After the transfer of the sovereignty of Macau to China, the Macau Special Administrative Region, the Legislative Assembly and the Judiciary were all put into practice accordingly under the regulation of the Basic Law.

The introduction of the Individual Visit Scheme policy made it easier for Chinese mainland residents to travel back and forth. In 2005 alone, there were more than 10 million tourists from mainland China, which made up 60% of the total number of tourists in Macau. The income from the gambling houses in Macau reached almost US$5.6 billion. On 15 July 2005, the Historic Centre of Macau was listed as a World Cultural Heritage site. The increasing development of tourism became a major factor in the rapid development of the economy of Macau.

For Portugal, the transfer of the sovereignty of Macau to China marked the end of the Portuguese Empire and its decolonisation process and also the end of European imperialism in China and Asia.

Before and after handover

Unchanged after 20 December 1999 

 Portuguese remains an official language. Public signs are bilingual in Portuguese and Traditional Chinese, although signs may also include English. However, many schools teach in Cantonese in parallel with Mandarin and Portuguese.
 The legal system remains separate from that of mainland China, broadly based on the Portuguese civil system, with some Portuguese judges continuing to serve.
 Macau retained the pataca as its currency, which remained the responsibility of the Monetary Authority of Macau, and pegged to the Hong Kong dollar. However, the Bank of China began issuing banknotes in 1995.
 The border with the mainland, while now known as the boundary, continues to be patrolled as before, with separate immigration and customs controls.
 Macau citizens are still required to apply for a Mainland Travel Permit, in order to visit mainland China.
 Citizens of mainland China still do not have the right of abode in Macau, except if they were born in Macau (before or after the establishment of the SAR). Instead, they had to apply for a permit to visit or settle in Macau from the PRC government. 
 Macau continues to operate as a separate customs territory from mainland China.
 Macau remains an individual member of various international organizations, such as APEC and WTO.
 Macau continued to negotiate and maintain its own aviation bilateral treaties with foreign countries and territories. These include flights to Taiwan.
 Macau remains an individual member of sporting organizations such as FIFA. However, the Sports and Olympic Committee of Macau, China, while a member of the Olympic Council of Asia, is not a member of the International Olympic Committee.  
 Macau citizens continue to have easier access to many countries, including those in Europe and North America, with Macau SAR passport holders having visa-free access to 117 other countries and territories.  
 Foreign nationals, including Portuguese citizens, are allowed to hold high-level positions in the administration, except the office of Chief Executive; those who will apply for Chief Executive position will have to be naturalized as Chinese. This was in contrast to Hong Kong, where such positions were restricted to citizens of the SAR. 
 Members of the existing Legislative Assembly, who had been elected in 1996, remained in office until 2001, although those who had been appointed by the Governor were replaced by those appointed by the incoming Chief Executive. 
 Foreign nationals, including Portuguese citizens, are still allowed to stand for directly elected seats in the Legislative Assembly. This is in contrast to Hong Kong, where foreign nationals can only stand for indirectly elected seats in the Legislative Council.  
 Macau continues to have more political freedoms than mainland China, with the holding of demonstrations and annual memorials to commemorate the Tiananmen Square protests of 1989 in Senado Square. However, pro-democracy politicians and academics from Hong Kong were refused entry.
 Macau continues to have more freedom of the press than mainland China despite the growing influence of Beijing and Hong Kong journalists being refused entry.
 Macau continues to have its own civic groups participating in the political system. These are separate from the Communist-led United Front on the mainland.
 Macau also continues to have more religious freedoms, with the Roman Catholic Diocese of Macau remaining under the jurisdiction of the Holy See, instead of the Chinese Patriotic Catholic Association on the mainland. However, the Falun Gong spiritual practice has faced restrictions.
 Macau continues to drive on the left unlike Mainland China, all of which has driven on the right since 1946, or Portugal and most other Portuguese colonies, which switched to the right in 1928. Vehicle registration plates continued to follow the old Portuguese format, with white characters on a black plate. This had been discontinued in Portugal in 1992.  
 Macau-registered vehicles can travel to and from mainland China, but require special cross-border plates, similar to those of Guangdong.
 Macau retains a separate international dialling code (853) and telephone numbering plan from that of the mainland. Calls between Macau and the mainland still require international dialling.
 Macau retains different technical standards from mainland China, such as British-style electrical plugs. However, Macau would later adopt the digital TV standard devised in mainland China, instead of DVB-T, replacing PAL-I for TV transmissions.
 Macau retains a separate ISO 3166 code, MO. It also retains a top-level domain, .mo. However, the Chinese code CN-92 was also used.
 Macau retains its own separate postal services, with Correios de Macau operating separately from China Post. Macau was not made part of the Chinese postcode system, nor did it introduce a postcode system of its own.
 Portuguese-influenced place names remain unchanged, although their unrelated Chinese equivalents are already in use; for example, Avenida Almeida Ribeiro is known as San Ma Lou or "new road".
 Portuguese monuments remain, although the statue of former Governor João Maria Ferreira do Amaral was taken down in 1992. The statue is now located at the Bairro da Encarnação, Lisbon, Portugal, where it was placed in December 1999.
 The floor on the ground level continues to be officially referred to by the Portuguese abbreviation R/C (rés-do-chão).

Changed after 20 December 1999 

 The Chief Executive of Macau became the head of government, elected by a selection committee with 300 members, who mainly are elected from among professional sectors and business leaders in Macau. The Governor was appointed by Portugal.
 The former Governor's Palace is now known as the Government Headquarters.
 The Court of Final Appeal became the highest court of appeal in Macau. This replaced the Superior Court of Justice, established in April 1993. Appeals to the Court of Appeal of the Judiciary District of Lisbon ceased in 1999.
 All public offices now fly the flags of the PRC and the Macau SAR. The Flag of Portugal now flies only outside the Portuguese Consulate-General and other Portuguese premises.
 The People's Liberation Army established a garrison in Macau, the first military presence there since the Portuguese military garrison had been withdrawn following the Carnation Revolution in 1974.
 The Central People's Government is now formally represented in Macau by a Liaison Office. This has been established in 1987 as a branch of Xinhua News Agency, when Macau was under Portuguese administration. Before 1987, it was informally represented by the Nanguang trading company.
 The Macau SAR Government is now formally represented in Beijing by the Office of the Government of the Macau Special Administrative Region.
 Elsewhere, the Macau SAR Government is now represented by Macau Economic and Trade Offices in Lisbon (Portugal), Brussels (European Union), Geneva (World Trade Organization) and Taipei (Taiwan).
 The Ministry of Foreign Affairs of the People's Republic of China is represented in Macau by a Commissioner.
 The Municipalities of Macau and the Ilhas, which had been retained provisionally following the transfer of sovereignty, were abolished and replaced by the Civic and Municipal Affairs Bureau with effect from 1 January 2002.
 Portugal was now represented in Macau by the Portuguese Consulate-General, also accredited to Hong Kong. This had responsibility for matters relating to Portuguese nationals. However, residents of Macau born after 3 October 1981 were no longer entitled to Portuguese nationality.
 The Taipei Trade and Tourism Office, the de facto mission of Taiwan, was renamed the Taipei Trade and Cultural Office, and was allowed to issue visas in 2002. It was later renamed the Taipei Economic and Cultural Office in Macau in 2011.
 The words "República Portuguesa" no longer appear on postage stamps, which now display the words "Macau, China". The Portuguese coat of arms had already been removed from Macanese pataca banknotes and coins issued since 1988.
 The Macau Police badge now displays the Macau SAR emblem.
 The Portuguese honours system was replaced by a local system, with the Grand Medal of Lotus Flower as the highest award.
 Public holidays changed, with Macau SAR Establishment Day being introduced and Portuguese-inspired occasions, such as Republic Day and Freedom Day, being abolished. PRC National Day had been made a public holiday in 1981.
 Macau's aircraft registration prefix changed from Portugal's CS to B, as used by mainland China, Taiwan and Hong Kong.
 The Portuguese national anthem A Portuguesa, is no longer played after closedown on television stations. The Chinese national anthem, March of the Volunteers, is now played instead.
 A giant golden statue of a lotus, erected in a public space outside the Macau Forum named Lotus Square, was presented by the State Council of the People's Republic of China to commemorate the return of Macau to Chinese sovereignty.
 The University of Macau was relocated to a new campus on Hengqin Island in 2009. This was under the jurisdiction of the Macau SAR government, which had leased a plot of land for M$1.2 billion until 2049.

See also 
 Handover of Hong Kong
 One country, two systems
 Handover Gifts Museum of Macao
 Time Capsule (Macau)

References

Further reading 
 Lai, Pauline Pou San. "Civil service training in the Macau Government" (Chapter 7). In: Podger, Andrew and John Wanna (editors). Sharpening the Sword of State: Building Executive Capacities in the Public Services of Asia-Pacific. ANU Press, 2016.  (paperback), 9781760460730 (ebook). HTML version of the chapter.

External links 
 
 The Chinese garrison in Macau 

1999 in Macau
History of Macau
Portuguese Macau
1999 in China
1999 in Portugal
States and territories disestablished in 1999
China–Portugal relations
Macau–Portugal relations
Sovereignty
December 1999 events in Asia
Decolonization